This is a list of flag bearers who have represented Czech Republic at the Olympics.

Flag bearers carry the national flag of their country at the opening ceremony of the Olympic Games.

See also
Czech Republic at the Olympics

References

Czech Republic at the Olympics
Czech Republic
Olympic flagbearers